Košarkaški klub Kolubara Lazarevac 2003, commonly referred to as KK Kolubara LA 2003, is a men's professional basketball club based in Lazarevac, Serbia. The club was named after Kolubara River. They are currently competing in the Basketball League of Serbia.

Players

Current roster

Coaches 

  Boško Đokić
  Marijan Novović (1988–1989)
  Dragan Veljković (1990–1993)
  Rajko Maravić (1994–1995)
  Dejan Srzić (1997–1998)
  Srđan Jeković (2007–2009)
  Žarko Simić (2012–2015)
  Srđan Jeković (2015–2016)
  Žarko Simić (2016–2019)
  Dušan Radović (2019–2020)
  Marko Dimitrijević (2020–2021)
  Stevan Mijović (2021–2022)
  Darko Kostić (2022–present)

Trophies and awards

Trophies
 Second League of Serbia (2nd-tier)
 Winners (1): 2018–19
 First Regional League (Central Division) (3rd-tier)
 Winners (2): 2012–13, 2015–16

Notable players 
  Nenad Vučinić
  Nikola Čvorović
  Brandon Penn

See also 
 FK Kolubara
 Sport in Lazarevac

References

External links
 
 Profile at srbijasport.net 
 Profile at eurobasket.com

Kolubara
Basketball teams established in 1970
1970 establishments in Serbia
Sport in Lazarevac